The New York Weekly was a story newspaper published from 1858–1910 in New York City.  Under related names it was published from 1846–1915.

The paper had its origins in 1846 as the New York Dispatch (1846–1854), and New York Weekly Dispatch (1855–1858), with Amor J. Williamson as proprietor. and was purchased by Francis Shubael Smith and Francis Scott Street in 1858.  Smith was an editor at the Dispatch and Street a bookkeeper, and they paid $40,000 for the ownership of the paper (paying nothing up front, but paying it off within 5 years).

From 1910-15 it was published as the New York Weekly Welcome.

See also
 Street & Smith

References

External links
 Street and Smith's New York Weekly, selected issues, via Villanova University

Defunct newspapers published in New York City
Street & Smith
Publications established in 1846
Publications disestablished in 1915
1846 establishments in New York (state)